Pam Golding Property Group is an international real estate company, based in Cape Town, South Africa. Founded in 1976 by Pam Golding, the company is in operation through a franchise system.

History
Pam Golding Property Group was founded by Pam Golding in 1976. The company opened an office in London in 1986.

In 2018, the Pam Golding Property Group acquired Cape Town-based online digital estate agency Eazi.com. CEO Andrew Golding stated that the acquisition would serve as part of the group's strategy to adopt an online, hybrid estate agency model, using technology to reduce costs, as well as access, to a greater degree, a higher volume, lower cost segment of the property market.

In the same year, the company announced a strategic joint venture partnership with BidX1, the second largest auction house in Britain and Ireland, for a digital auction platform.

Operations
The company is headquartered in Cape Town, South Africa. Pam Golding Property Group has a network of over 300 offices in Sub-Saharan Africa, as well as offices in the United Kingdom, Germany, Mauritius, and Seychelles. Pam Golding Property Group also facilitates property sales and residency in Spain and Portugal, as well as property sales in the United States.

Pam Golding Property Group operates the following companies:
 Pam Golding Properties (wholly owned, franchised branch office network for property sales and rentals)
 Pam Golding Projects and International (international marketing and sales of leisure projects)
 Pam Golding Property Management Services (residential sectional title division)
 Pam Golding Africa (sales and marketing network)
 Pam Golding Hospitality (advisory and agency services)
 Pam Golding Mortgage Origination (assistance with property loan information)

Partnerships and memberships
The company has a partnership with South African mortgage company ooba, of which the former's CEO, Andrew Golding, is a board member, and residence and citizenship planning company Henley & Partners.

Pam Golding Property Group also has partnerships with London-based real estate services company Savills, professional services company The Sable Group, is a member of Homecoming Revolution, the Southern Africa Luxury Association, The Luxury Network, and is registered with the Franchise Association of South Africa (FASA).

Corporate Social Investment
In 2015, the company launched the Heart of Gold Trust, aimed at nurturing young talent by investing in the education of youth who do not have adequate financial resources. The Trust partnered with the Make A Difference Leadership Foundation, through which individuals can apply for a Heart of Gold Trust scholarship.

Pam Golding Property Group was also a founding member of the Proudly South African initiative, aimed at promoting local purchasing, in order to combat poverty, inequality, and unemployment.

Awards
Pam Golding Property Group has won awards in categories in the Overseas Property Professional Awards, International Property Awards, African Excellence Awards, and has been awarded Superbrands Status.

References 

Franchises
Companies based in Cape Town
Real estate companies of South Africa
Real estate companies established in 1976